"Quarantine" is the second segment of the seventeenth episode from the first season (1985–86) of the television series The Twilight Zone. In this segment, a man awakens from suspended animation in a postapocalyptic world where humans have shunned all forms of technology and utilize powerful psychic abilities.

Plot
Matthew Foreman is awakened from cryogenic sleep by a woman named Sarah, who confirms he was suspended in June 2023 and the year is now 2347. Sarah and two others use psychic abilities to take out the cause of the incurable disease that required him to be put into cryogenic sleep, without the use of instruments, anesthetic, or sterilization. Sarah explains that technology has been eliminated, and everyone now wields one of a number of specialized psychic abilities by tapping into a "biological gestalt." In 2043, a nuclear exchange wiped out 80% of the human population. The survivors pledged to never trust machines again. In the struggle to establish a society without technology, the human population dwindled to just 200,000. Every need in the agrarian post-apocalyptic community is met through genetic engineering and psionics, with computers replaced by monkeys who are voluntarily modified into immobile masses of tissue with oversized brains that telepathically transmit knowledge.

They have awoken Matthew because a meteor, sufficient to alter the entire ecosystem of Earth, is about to crash into the Indian subcontinent. His work with a satellite defense system can destroy the meteor. Despondent, Matthew believes because he does not share the gifts of the others in the village, he will never belong to their community. Sarah tells him they can perform surgery on his brain and give him the same abilities they have.

Matthew operates a salvaged personal computer used by the commune to interface with the old satellite laser network. After the meteor makes a course correction upon reaching orbit, Matthew realizes it is not a meteor, but a United States spacecraft. The passengers are refugees of the war, returning 300 years later due to the relativity of time during space travel. Sarah and the others elected to kill them to prevent their contaminating society with technology, using their psychic powers to fool Matthew. Matthew attempts to stop the weapon. Sarah thwarts his efforts by removing a piece of equipment from the computer, and the ship is destroyed. Matthew is overcome by guilt at his part in the murder of a thousand people, and does not know his value to the community. Irene claims he is one of them now, and he begins his psychic journey.

Production
"Quarantine" originated as an unproduced film script called "Terminal" which was co-written by The Twilight Zone executive producer Philip DeGuere. Some time after it became apparent that the script was not going to be picked up, DeGuere obtained permission from his writing collaborator to use the story for The Twilight Zone. The teleplay for the segment was written by Alan Brennert, who made several significant changes to the story, such as adding in the idea of surgery without instruments and the plot point of Matthew discovering the psychic deception before the ship is destroyed.

References

External links
 

1986 American television episodes
The Twilight Zone (1985 TV series season 1) episodes
Cryonics in fiction
Fiction set in 2023
Fiction set in the 24th century
Television episodes about nuclear war and weapons

fr:Sursis (La Cinquième Dimension)